Gharkhana is a village in Samrala tehsil, Ludhiana district, Punjab, India. It is located 36 km East of district headquarters Ludhiana and 66 km from the state capital Chandigarh. Other nearby cities include Khanna, Morinda and Nawanshahr.

The local language is Punjabi.

Schools near Gharkhana include:
Mata Gurdev Kaur Memorial Shahi Sports College of Physical Education
Punjab Public School
Aarti Memorial Public School
Kinder Garden Senior Secondary School
Usha Devi Public School

References

  
Villages in Ludhiana district